The 1963–64 Libyan Premier League was the first edition of the competition, the first football competition at national level. The recently founded Libyan Football Federation organised the competition.

Prior to this, competitive football in Libya was played at regional level (since 1918). There were three Provincial Championships, Western, Eastern and Southern. The regional champions at the time came together to contest the first national title. They were:

 Ahly Benghazi (1962–63 Eastern Champions)
 Ahly Tripoli  (1962–63 Western Champions)
 Hilal Sebha   (1962–63 Southern Champions)

Hilal Sebha withdrew from the competition due to lack of resources, meaning that Ahly Benghazi and Ahly Tripoli faced a  two-legged playoff tie, the winners of which would be crowned Libyan Premier League champions for the 1963–64 season.

Ahly Tripoli win the Libyan Premier League with a 2–0 aggregate scoreline.

References

External links
RSSSF
goalzz.com

Libyan Premier League seasons
Libya
Premier League